American Airlines Shuttle was the brand name for American Airlines' hourly air shuttle service operating in the Northeastern United States. It served Logan International Airport in Boston, LaGuardia Airport in New York City, Ronald Reagan Washington National Airport in Washington, D.C., and O'Hare International Airport in Chicago. American Airlines discontinued the Shuttle product in 2021 due to the effects of the COVID-19 pandemic.

History
The brand was transferred to American Airlines after its final integration with US Airways was completed on October 17, 2015. It is the descendant of the original Eastern Air Lines Shuttle, which began operating in 1961, and in subsequent iterations operated as Trump Shuttle, USAir Shuttle, and US Airways Shuttle. Its direct rival was Delta Shuttle, the corporate descendant of Pan Am Shuttle.

In 2021, American discontinued the Shuttle product due to the effects of the COVID-19 pandemic. It also ceded the LaGuardia to Boston route to Jetblue as part of their Northeast Alliance.

Services
American Airlines Shuttle offered hourly weekday flights between the four cities. There were slight schedule changes for weekend flights, with Saturday flights primarily departing in the morning/afternoon and Sunday flights mostly hourly or every other hour.

Shuttle flights had dedicated check-in facilities and baggage carousels, workstations at gates in Boston, complimentary snacks and alcoholic beverages in all cabins, and other services.

With the COVID-19 pandemic outbreak in 2020 resulting in a large drop in business traffic, American Airlines was forced to reduce service to less than hourly in all four markets. Hourly service has since been reinstated in the Chicago-LaGuardia market; however, all service in the Boston-LaGuardia market ended on January 4, 2022 and remaining routes are no longer marketed as American Airlines Shuttle, with the product having been discontinued in 2021

Fleet
The American Airlines Shuttle utilized its Airbus A319, Embraer 175, and Boeing 737 aircraft.

References

American Airlines Group
Regional airline brands